Gnoma jugalis is a species of beetle in the family Cerambycidae. It was described by Newman in 1842. It is known from the Philippines.

Subspecies
 Gnoma jugalis jugalis Newman, 1842
 Gnoma jugalis meridionalis Schwarzer, 1929
 Gnoma jugalis samar Dillon & Dillon, 1951

References

Lamiini
Beetles described in 1842